
This is a list of the 25 players who earned their 2010 PGA Tour card through Q School in 2009.

2010 Results

*PGA Tour rookie in 2010
T = Tied 
Green background indicates the player retained his PGA Tour card for 2011 (finished inside the top 125). 
Yellow background indicates the player did not retain his PGA Tour card for 2011, but retained conditional status (finished between 126-150). 
Red background indicates the player did not retain his PGA Tour card for 2011 (finished outside the top 150).

Runners-up on the PGA Tour in 2010

See also
2009 Nationwide Tour graduates

References
2010 PGA Tour rookies
Player profiles
Money list

PGA Tour Qualifying School
PGA Tour Qualifying School Graduates
PGA Tour Qualifying School Graduates